Eumillipes is a genus of millipede in the family Siphonotidae. It contains a single species, E. persephone, known from the Eastern Goldfields of Western Australia.

Etymology 
Its generic name, Eumillipes, means "true millipede" (or "true thousand feet"), referring to its possession of over 1,000 legs; its specific name, persephone, alludes to the Greek goddess of the same name, who was the queen of the underworld, in reference to its subterranean lifestyle.

Description

It has a highly elongated body with a cone shaped head and unusually large, thick antennae. It is eyeless, a trait not found in any other Australian polyzoniidan. Its elongated shape, large number of legs, and eyeless condition is convergent with the distantly related Illacme plenipes of North America, the previous record holder with up to 750 legs. The large number of legs is believed to assist it with moving in its underground habitat, enabling it to crawl inside small crevices.

It varies from most members of Polyzoniida, with its elongated shape and thin body, as members of that order are usually shorter, with fewer legs and flatter dome-shaped bodies. Its inclusion in this order was based on analysis of its genome to determine a common ancestor.

Its diet and lifestyle details are unknown, but it is thought that it may feed on fungi growing on the roots of trees.

References

 

Polyzoniida
Millipedes of Oceania
Arthropods of Western Australia
Endemic fauna of Australia
Monotypic arthropod genera
Animals described in 2021

de:Eumillipes persephone
fr:Eumillipes persephone
no:Eumillipes persephone
pl:Eumillipes persephone
pt:Eumillipes persephone
ru:Eumillipes persephone